Mazrabad (also Romanized as Mazrābād and Marzābād) is a village in Baqeran Rural District, in the Central District of Birjand County, South Khorasan Province, Iran. At the time of the 2006 census, its population was 46, in 20 families.

References 

Populated places in Birjand County